Pablo Carmine Maffeo Becerra (born 12 July 1997) is a Spanish professional footballer who plays as a right-back for RCD Mallorca.

Club career

Early career
Born in Sant Joan Despí, Barcelona, Catalonia, of Italian descent, Maffeo joined RCD Espanyol's youth setup in 2003, from FC Levante Las Planas. On 7 April 2013, he made his senior debut for the reserves at the age of only 15, coming on as a late substitute in a 1–0 home win against CE Constància in the Segunda División B.

Manchester City
On 3 July 2013, Maffeo and compatriot Manu García moved abroad, agreeing to a contract with Manchester City. He was initially assigned to the under-18 team, progressing through the club's Elite Development squad.

Maffeo was called up by first-team manager Manuel Pellegrini for a match against Watford on 29 August 2015, but remained unused in the 2–0 home win. He would subsequently make the bench on a few more occasions, aside from appearing with the under-19s in UEFA Youth League.

Maffeo made his competitive debut for City 24 August 2016, starting in a 1–0 victory over FC Steaua București in the play-off round of the UEFA Champions League. His second start came two months later, in a 1–0 loss at Manchester United in the EFL Cup.

Girona
On 13 January 2016, after signing a new three-year contract with City, Maffeo joined Segunda División club Girona FC on loan until June. He made his professional debut on 7 February, replacing Borja García in a 1–1 home draw against Gimnàstic de Tarragona.

On 27 December 2016, it was announced Maffeo would rejoin Girona on loan until the end of the season. On 15 April 2017, he was sent-off in stoppage time of the 3–3 away draw with CD Tenerife. He contributed one goal from 14 appearances in a first-ever promotion to La Liga.

Maffeo agreed to a third loan spell at the Estadi Montilivi on 31 July 2017. He made his debut in the competition on 19 August, starting in a 2–2 home draw against Atlético Madrid.

When Maffeo played against FC Barcelona, he man-marked Lionel Messi superbly. This prompted the latter to name the former as the toughest opponent that he had ever faced.

VfB Stuttgart
On 14 May 2018, Maffeo signed a five-year contract with VfB Stuttgart, with the deal being made effective on 1 July. His first appearance in the Bundesliga took place on 26 August, in a 1–0 away loss to 1. FSV Mainz 05 where he featured the full 90 minutes. 

Maffeo was loaned back to Girona on 20 June 2019. On 8 September 2020, he joined SD Huesca also in a temporary deal but with an option to make the move permanent. He scored his first goal in the Spanish top division five days later, in the 1–1 draw at Villarreal CF.

Mallorca
On 7 July 2021, Maffeo joined RCD Mallorca on a season-long loan. On 29 June 2022, he agreed to a permanent four-year contract.

Personal life
Maffeo's younger brother, Víctor, is also a footballer and a defender.

Career statistics

References

External links

Girona official profile 

 

1997 births
Living people
People from Sant Joan Despí
Spanish people of Italian descent
Sportspeople of Italian descent
Sportspeople from the Province of Barcelona
Spanish footballers
Footballers from Catalonia
Association football defenders
La Liga players
Segunda División players
Segunda División B players
RCD Espanyol B footballers
Girona FC players
SD Huesca footballers
RCD Mallorca players
Manchester City F.C. players
Bundesliga players
VfB Stuttgart players
Spain youth international footballers
Spain under-21 international footballers
Spanish expatriate footballers
Expatriate footballers in England
Expatriate footballers in Germany
Spanish expatriate sportspeople in England
Spanish expatriate sportspeople in Germany